Trapania squama is a species of sea slug, a dorid nudibranch, a marine gastropod mollusc in the family Goniodorididae.

Distribution
This species was described from Madang, Papua New Guinea. It has also been reported from the Marshall Islands.

Description
The body of this goniodorid nudibranch has a pattern of white patches with thin lines of dark brown between them, giving a scaled appearance. The network of brown lines forms small square or diamond shapes where the lines intersect. The gills and rhinophores are transparent with white surface pigment and the lateral papillae are white. The oral tentacles are white or mottled white and brown in the holotype.

Ecology
The animals from the Marshall Islands apparently feed on a species of bryozoan.

References

Goniodorididae
Gastropods described in 2008